Americans for Job Security (AJS) is a Virginia-based pro-business league. The group has operated since 1997 and runs issue advertisements nationwide. Last month, CREW received notice that the FEC reached a conciliation agreement with AJS, requiring them to register as a political committee and disclose their donors, which they did.

History and related organizations
Michael Dubke, David Carney, and several business groups helped start Americans for Job Security in 1997. Carney was political director for President George H. W. Bush, and Dubke was the first executive director and then president of Americans for Job Security until April 2008, when Stephen DeMaura, recruited by Carney, took over.

In 2002, AJS ran over $1 million in advertising attacking Democrat Jeanne Shaheen, who was running for the US Senate from NH in opposition to Republican John Sununu. In the 2008, rematch between Shaheen and Sununu, AJS again funded advertising attacking Shaheen. In 2012, it bought $8 million worth of ads opposing Obama's reelection.

Complaints have been filed with the Federal Election Commission stating that Americans for Job Security should lose its 501(c)(6) status, which is reserved for "business leagues and trade associations" rather than groups that seek to influence elections. In September 2019, the Federal Election Commission reached a conciliation agreement with AJS, requiring them to register as a political committee and disclose their donors, which they did on October 25, 2019. 

Notable donors include:

 Peter Thiel – $500,000
 Richard and Helen Devos – $2 million
 Sheldon and Miriam Adelson – $500,000
 Robert McNair – $1,000,000

Notable corporate donors include:

 Continental Resources – $1 million
 Devon Energy and Devon Energy Production Corp – $3 million
 Hensel Phelps Construction – $2.93 million
 Penn National Gaming – $737,000
 US Sugar Corp – $750,000
 Wynn Resorts – $500,000
 Bass Pro Shops – $50,000
 Quicken Loans – $250,000

Previously known donors include Anthony Pritzker, Eli Broad, John Fisher and Charles Schwab. Schwab was known to have given millions to AJS, but the new information shows that he gave an additional $2.15 million.

In April 2018, watchdog groups filed complaints with the Internal Revenue Service against Americans for Job Security for failure to comply with federal rules governing nonprofits by not filing its taxes in over three years. Americans For Job Security's 501(c)(6) status was revoked by the Internal Revenue Service on June 1, 2018, retroactive to March 15, 2018.

Operation Trenchcoat
In Alaska, the Pebble Mine proposal was opposed for endangering commercial fishing, and supported for creating jobs. Alaskan financier Robert Gillam paid $2 million to join AJS, as encouraged to by Dubke, expecting the money to be used to oppose the mine. Instead, AJS passed almost all of it onto another nonprofit, Alaskans for Clean Water, set up to push a ballot initiative, Alaska Clean Water Initiative, 2008, aimed at imposing clean-water restrictions on the mine, by a group that included Art Hackney, a local Republican consultant and board member of AJS. The Alaska Public Offices Commission investigated, and AJS paid a $20,000 settlement without admitting guilt, agreeing not to help anyone make anonymous contributions in the future which involved Alaska elections, but without the agreement applying to other states.

References

External links
Americans for Job Security official site
Americans for Job Security, 2004 Election Cycle at OpenSecrets.org
Donor list from 2010 to 2012, released by AJS to satisfy FEC conciliation agreement of 2019.
501(c)(6) nonprofit organizations
Non-profit organizations based in Alexandria, Virginia